Harry McCarthy (born 13 November 2001), is an Australian professional footballer who plays as a midfielder.

Playing career

Club

Central Coast Mariners
McCarthy made his debut for Central Coast Mariners in the 2021 FFA Cup against Wollongong Wolves on 1 December 2021. After being substituted on in the second half, he scored the winning goal, a header, three minutes later.

Manly United FC
On December 7th 2022, Manly United FC announced McCarthy has signed to the club.

See also
List of Central Coast Mariners FC players

References

External links

Living people
Australian soccer players
Association football midfielders
Central Coast Mariners FC players
A-League Men players
2001 births